Maribel Guardia (born Maribel Del Rocío Fernández García on May 29, 1959, in San José, Costa Rica) is a Costa Rican-Mexican actress, model, singer and TV hostess. She was winner of Miss Costa Rica 1978 and contestant in Miss Universe 1978.

Miss Universe and Miss World
Guardia was elected Miss Costa Rica in 1978, going on to represent her country at the Miss Universe 1978 beauty pageant (did not place but was selected as Miss Photogenic), and the Miss World 1978 beauty pageant (placed as a top 15 semi-finalist). The Miss Universe pageant had been held in Acapulco, and she received offers by Televisa producer Sergio Bustamante to develop a career there, but she returned to her country. Months later she accepted the offer and returned to Mexico, leaving her mother and boyfriend.

Acting and singing career
Guardia moved to Mexico in 1980; this move proved to be crucial for her show business career. In 1980, she appeared in her first television show, alongside Manuel "El Loco" Valdés.

Guardia went on to make multiple telenovelas (soap operas) and release a series of albums in the Norteño music genre. She has been signed to three different labels since her debut album was released in 1988: first with Musart Records, then from the late-1990s until the mid-2000s with Fonovisa Records, and in recent years with EMI Televisa Music in Latin America and Capitol Records in the United States.

Guardia has acted alongside important actors, including Andrés García, Saul Lisazo, and Joan Sebastian. One of her major soap opera hits was alongside Sebastian. Together, they filmed Tú y yo. One film where she acted alongside Andrés García was Pedro Navaja, where she played the main character's wife. She also did a film called El Rey de Los Taxistas alongside Luis de Alba. She and another El Rey de Los Taxistas co-star, Aida Pierce, would work together again in the telenovela Serafin.

Recently she has done telenovelas for children. She has also done a comedy in 2006 that is called Que Madre, Tan Padre as well as the variety show, Muévete. In 2007, she was included in the book Televisa Presenta, which commemorated fifty years of network television in Mexico.

In 2008, she released a new album, the main single is "De Pecho A Pecho" (From Chest To Chest) written by the Nicaraguan composer, songwriter and singer Hernaldo Zúñiga. Apart from her jobs as an actress and singer, she has also modeled for various calendars and magazines, which are sold to her fans. Guardia also dated Jose Trujillo in the late 1970s.

Since late 2010 she married with Marco Chacón and lived with her son in Mexico City. Guardia has been inducted into the Paseo de las Luminarias in Mexico City.

In January 2010, she announced that she had worked all of 2009 on a new studio album, set to be released on February 13, 2010, under EMI Music, titled "Move You On – Muévete", which contained 12 tracks recorded in Mexico City, Texas & Colombia, eight tracks were in Spanish, the other four were in English.

Personal life
Guardia lived with Joan Sebastian for five years and had a son with him.

Telenovelas

References

External links
 
 Official website, Maribel Guardia
  Maribel Guardia @esmas.com
 Maribel Guardia Pictures

1959 births
20th-century Mexican actresses
21st-century Mexican actresses
Actresses from San José, Costa Rica
Costa Rican beauty pageant winners
Costa Rican emigrants to Mexico
Costa Rican expatriates in Mexico
Costa Rican expatriates in the United States
Costa Rican female models
Costa Rican women singers
Costa Rican television actresses
Living people
Mexican female models
Mexican women singers
Mexican film actresses
Mexican stage actresses
Mexican telenovela actresses
Mexican television actresses
Mexican television presenters
Mexican television talk show hosts
Mexican vedettes
Miss Universe 1978 contestants
Miss World 1978 delegates
People from San José, Costa Rica
OTI Festival presenters
Mexican women television presenters